Carnegie Foundation may refer to:

 Carnegie Corporation of New York, a foundation in the U.S. known as the Carnegie Foundation
 Carnegie Foundation (Netherlands), the managing organization of the Peace Palace in the Netherlands
 Carnegie Foundation for the Advancement of Teaching, a policy and research center in the U.S.
 Carnegie Foundation African Diaspora Fellowship, a program of the Institute of International Education funded by the Carnegie Corporation

See also
 Carnegie Endowment for International Peace, an international affairs think tank based in Washington, D.C., with offices in the Middle East, Europe, East Asia, and South Asia.
 Carnegie (disambiguation)